Charles Frédéric Petit (6 May 1857 – 19 February 1947) was a French competitor in the sport of archery.  Petit competed in two events and won third prize in each. He is now considered by the International Olympic Committee to have won two bronze medals.  Both of Petit's events were the shorter 33 metre competitions, in both the Au Chapelet and Au Cordon Doré style.

See also
 Archery at the 1900 Summer Olympics

Notes
  - Prizes at the time were silver medals for first place and bronze medals for second, as well as usually including cash awards.  The current gold, silver, bronze medal system was initiated at the 1904 Summer Olympics.  The International Olympic Committee has retroactively assigned medals in the current system to top three placers at early Olympics.

References

External links
 International Olympic Committee medal winners database
 DatabaseOlympics.com profile
 
 Frédéric Petit's profile at Sports Reference.com

1857 births
1947 deaths
Archers at the 1900 Summer Olympics
Olympic archers of France
French male archers
Olympic bronze medalists for France
Olympic medalists in archery
Medalists at the 1900 Summer Olympics